The 1936 Toronto Argonauts season was the 50th season for the team since the franchise's inception in 1873. The team finished in first place in the Interprovincial Rugby Football Union for the first time since 1922 with a 4–2 record and qualified for the playoffs, but lost the two-game total-points IRFU Final series to the Ottawa Rough Riders.

Regular season

Standings

Schedule

Postseason

References

Toronto Argonauts seasons